This is a list of current countries and territories with a flag that incorporates the Union Flag.  Five Commonwealth nations have the Union Flag on their national flag. The first Commonwealth country to drop the Union Flag was Canada in 1965, after adopting a new national flag.  The most recent country to drop the Union Flag from its flag was South Africa in 1994, after adopting a new national flag.  The only overseas territory without the Union Flag on its current flag is Gibraltar.

The list also includes overseas territories, provinces and states.

Current

Commonwealth nations

The Union Flag is an official ceremonial flag of Canada known as the Royal Union Flag.

Overseas territories

Federal provinces, territories and states

Cities

Other

Former

Countries

Overseas Territories

Settlement

See also
List of United Kingdom flags
Historical flags of the British Empire and the overseas territories

Notes

References
 

Union Jack
National symbols of Fiji
National symbols of Australia
National symbols of New Zealand
National symbols of Tuvalu